The South Sakhalin-Kurile mixed forests ecoregion (WWF ID: PA0438) is split between the southwest region of Sakhalin Island, and the southern three islands of the Kurile Islands chain in the Russian Far East. The ecoregion is in the Palearctic realm, with a Humid Continental climate.

Location and description 
The Sakhalin Island side of the ecoregion faces the Sea of Japan to the west, and the Okhotsk Sea to the east.  Being on the southern end of the island, plant life is denser and more varied.  The Kurile Islands side of the ecoregion has high levels of biodiversity, reflecting the islands' position along the meeting of warm and cold sea currents (the Pacific Ocean and Okhotsk Sea, respectively).  The resulting richness of marine life attracts large colonies of marine birds.  The ecoregion in the Kurils is defined as the southern three islands: Kunashir Island, Iturup, and Shikotan.  These islands were connected to the Japanese island of Hokkaido during the most recent glacial period, and unlike the northern two thirds of the Kuriles are not icebound in winter.

Climate 

Flora and fauna 
The area is characterized by high biodiversity because of the relatively mild climate, transition-zone placement, and island location.  The flora of the southern Kuriles is closely related to that of Hokkaido, and endemism is low.  A dominant floral community in the southern Kuriles is the bamboo thicket.  Snow falling on the evergreen bamboo thickets in winter insulate the understory, which is relatively empty but abounding in shrews, mice and other rodents.  These animals also thrive in the high-growth thickets, typified by white clover and "Sakhalin buckwheat" (Reynoutrua sachalinensis).

Although plant communities are favorable to rodents, a noteworthy feature of the animal life in the southern Kuriles is the predominance of predator species, such as fox, sable, and bear, which have had to develop broader sources of food, particular marine sources on the coasts.  Salmon are abundant in the streams.

Protections 
Notable protected areas of the Russian Federation in the ecoregion include:
 Kurils Nature Reserve, which covers the north and south regions of Kunashir Island in the Kurils. (Area: 654 km2)
This is an IUCN class Ia "strict ecological reserves" (Zapovednik).

See also 
 List of ecoregions in Russia

References 

Ecoregions of Russia
Geography of the Russian Far East
Palearctic ecoregions
Temperate broadleaf and mixed forests